Joget (Jawi: جوڬيت) is a traditional Malay dance that originated in Malacca. It was influenced by the Portuguese dance of Branyo which is believed to have been spread to Malacca during the spice trade. In Malacca, it is better known as Chakunchak. The dance is one of the most popular folk dances in Malaysia and normally performed by couples in cultural festivals, weddings and other social functions. Joget also grew in popularity within the Malay community in Singapore after its introduction in 1942.

The dance is of the Portuguese roots and is accompanied by an ensemble consisting of; a violin of Western world, a knobbed gong of Asia, a flute (optional) and at least two rebana or gendang of Maritime Southeast Asia. The tempo of Joget music is fairly quick with the feeling of teasing and playing between the partners. The music emphasizes duple- and triple-beat division, both in alternation and simultaneously, and sung in the northeast Malaysia style. 

One of the most popular type of Joget is called "Joget Lambak" and usually performed by a large crowd together in social functions.
In Indonesia, the term 'joget' is usually applied to any form of popular street dance, such as that to dangdut music.
Joget, an open source workflow software built in Malaysia, is named after this dance.

Sri Lankan Kaffiringna music style and Joget has some related melodic variations,both styles are having a Portuguese influence ,
Sri Lankan musicologist Ruwin Dias from the university of performing arts  has done a research about the similarities in Kaffiringna and Joget .

References

Malay dances
Malay culture
Malaysian culture